Lupton is a civil parish in the South Lakeland District of Cumbria, England. It contains 13 listed buildings that are recorded in the National Heritage List for England.  All the listed buildings are designated at Grade II, the lowest of the three grades, which is applied to "buildings of national importance and special interest".  The parish is almost completely rural, without any major settlement.  The listed buildings consist of houses, farmhouses, farm buildings, a church, a bridge, milestones, and a boundary stone.


Buildings

References

Citations

Sources

Lists of listed buildings in Cumbria